Rick Ottema (born 25 June 1992 in Groningen) is a Dutch cyclist, who currently rides for UCI Continental team .

Major results

2010
 1st Stage 2 (TTT) Liège–La Gleize
 8th Paris–Roubaix Juniors
2011
 8th Rogaland GP
2012
 9th Omloop der Kempen
2015
 10th Zuid Oost Drenthe Classic I
2016
 5th Ronde van Overijssel
2017
 1st ZODC Zuidenveld Tour
 1st  Mountains classification Tour du Loir-et-Cher
2018
 4th Dwars door de Vlaamse Ardennen
 6th Ronde van Drenthe
2019
 7th Memorial Rik Van Steenbergen
2020
 1st  Mountains classification Bałtyk–Karkonosze Tour
2022
 5th Overall Tour du Loir-et-Cher
1st  Mountains classification
1st Stage 5
 5th Overall Olympia's Tour
 6th PWZ Zuidenveld Tour
 9th Ronde van Drenthe

References

External links

1992 births
Living people
Dutch male cyclists
Sportspeople from Groningen (city)
Cyclists from Groningen (province)